A wet-transfer film gate, or wet gate for short, is a film gate that is submerged in liquid, used for film restoration and archival scanning. Submerging the film in the gate in a liquid with a suitably matched refractive index reduces the effects of scratches on the film, by reducing the refractive effects which divert light that passes through the scratched part of the film. The liquid also acts to lift other forms of defects from the film.  Perchloroethylene, a hazardous substance with multiple health and safety risks, is commonly used as the liquid medium in wet gate systems, requiring substantial precautions to be taken to ensure the safety of operators and to prevent pollution.

Wet gate transfer is often preceded by other forms of film cleaning, such as the use of ultrasonic film cleaners.

References

See also 
 Registration pin
 Optical printing#Restoration printing
Full immersion wet-transfer film gate

Film and video technology